Communist Struggle (Marxist–Leninist) (Lutte Communiste (Marxiste-Leniniste)) was a minor communist group in Belgium, existing in the end of the 1970s. It published the magazine Lutte Communiste.

The organisation emerged from the students movement in Liège in 1972. In December 1978 it merged with the Marxist-Leninist Communist Party of Belgium, but by that time most of its members had deserted.

References

Defunct communist parties in Belgium
Political parties established in 1972
1972 establishments in Belgium
Political parties disestablished in 1978
1978 disestablishments in Belgium